S.O.A.P. were a Danish pop music duo made up of the two sisters Heidi "Suriya" Sørensen (born 18 October 1979) and Saseline "Line" Sørensen (born 26 July 1982). Their music was primarily written by Remee and produced by Holger Lagerfeldt for Sony Music Entertainment Denmark. They released two albums before they disbanded in 2002. They are best known for their single "This Is How We Party", and sold almost 2 million albums worldwide.

History
Heidi and Saseline were born in the state of Perak in Malaysia though were raised in Næstved, along with their younger brother Daniel. Their father is Danish and their mother is Malaysian. Heidi met Remee when she interviewed him for the youth magazine she worked for. Her father, who had accompanied her to the interview, mentioned to Remee that Heidi was a singer. Remee asked Heidi to sing on a solo album with him, however, she stated that she would not do anything without her sister. Remee subsequently withdrew his offer, though approached the girls a year later stating he wanted to produce an album with both of them. The sisters chose the name S.O.A.P. because they thought it was fun, although it did not stand for anything.  Heidi and Saseline once held a competition for their fans to come up with a backronym. "Sisters Organising A Party" was one of their favourite choices, though they were unimpressed by the "countless unsavoury submissions".

Their first album, Not Like Other Girls, was released on 18 March 1998 in Denmark for Sony Music Entertainment. It was released in the US on 5 May, as a self-titled album on Crave Records, with a European release under Sony held around the same time. Remee wrote the lyrics for the album, which was produced by Holger Lagerfeldt. The album was certified gold in Finland and Denmark, and had sold over 15,000 copies in the US by July 1998. By August 2000, it had sold 1.5 million copies worldwide. It featured the successful debut single, This Is How We Party, which spent ten weeks in the top five in Denmark, reached No.1 in Sweden where it achieved gold status, and was also certified platinum in Australia, where it reached No. 7. The song found significant radio coverage in the US, and S.O.A.P. were described in Billboard as "looking to be the biggest thing out of Denmark since Aqua." The second single from the album, Ladidi Ladida, was certified gold in Australia, where it reached No. 15. In the US, Stand By You was chosen as the second single from the album and was released in late June; the song was later recorded by S Club 7 on their album 7. S.O.A.P. won two of their four nominations at the 1999 Danish Music Awards: best new act and best pop album for Not Like Other Girls.

S.O.A.P. opened for the Backstreet Boys on their Backstreet's Back Tour in 1998 at 25 venues in the US between 8 July and 14 August. In 1999 they recorded the Christmas song Let Love Be Love alongside Juice and Christina featuring Remee. The song remains popular at Christmas time in Denmark, where it charted in 2007 and again in 2011 at No. 20 and No. 34 respectively. The song was certified gold by the International Federation of the Phonographic Industry in December 2013. They were also selected by Australian duo Savage Garden to be the opening act on their 2000 European tour. In 2000 they released their second and final album, Miracle. The album was less successful than their debut, with its lead single, S.O.A.P. Is In The Air, only charting in Denmark and Sweden, where it reached No. 3 and No. 25 respectively. S.O.A.P. sold nearly two million albums worldwide. In 2012 they were described by Eurovision as one of Denmark's most successful musical exports.

Disbandment and later work
In 2002, S.O.A.P. disbanded. From 2002 till 2003, Saseline was a TV presenter, hosting the Danish music program Boogie. In 2005, she featured on the charity single "Hvor små vi er" and was also a contestant on the show Expedition Robinson 2005 (VIP), the Danish version of Survivor. She had a son with tennis player Frederik Fetterlein in 2008, though the couple separated during her pregnancy. In 2010, she released a solo album, Restart. In 2012, she was a contestant on Vild med dans, the Danish version of Dancing with the Stars. In 2014, she had another son with her boyfriend Michael Dreyer. In 2016, Saseline Sørensen changed her name to Saszeline Emanuelle Dreyer after visiting a numerologist. During the COVID-19 pandemic, Saszeline drew controversy for spreading misinformation regarding COVID-19 and its vaccines, leading to her being banned from Instagram.

Heidi took a break from the music industry after S.O.A.P. disbanded, and trained to become a tattoo artist while learning to write her own music. She later recorded as a solo artist under the name Suriya, releasing her first single "My Desire" in 2008 and second single "Louis Bag" in 2011. Her song "Forever I B Young" was chosen as a wildcard entry for the Dansk Melodi Grand Prix 2012, the danish national selection for the Eurovision Song Contest.

Discography

Albums

Singles

References

Danish musical duos
Sibling musical duos
Danish girl groups
Danish pop music groups
Pop music duos
Female musical duos
Musical groups established in 1997
Musical groups disestablished in 2002
Danish Eurodance groups
English-language singers from Denmark